Bukonys is a village in Jonava district municipality, in Kaunas County, in central Lithuania. According to the 2001 census, the village has a population of 657 people.

The village has Bukonių primary school, post office (ZIP code: 55075), Bukonių church of St. archangel Mykolas (built in 1829), cemetery and residues of a manor.

Gallery

References

Villages in Jonava District Municipality